The Natural Monuments of Nepal includes mountains, rivers, lakes, waterfalls, national parks, wildlife reserves, bird sanctuary, land terraces and flood way.
The Nepal Nature Conservation Act 1982 (Raastriya Praakrtik Sanrakshan Kosh Ain 2039 BS) was made to protect and develop the Natural Monuments of Nepal. The monument list below is populated using the authentic information at Ministry of Forests and Environment.

Mountains in Nepal

Nepal contains part of the Himalayas, the highest mountain range in the world. Eight of the fourteen eight-thousanders are located in the country and the highest mountain in the world, Mount Everest.

National Parks of Nepal

Nepal has 12 national parks. Chitwan National Park is the first national park in Nepal established in 1973.

Conservation areas in Nepal
Nepal has 6 conservation areas.

References

External links

 
Nepal geography-related lists